The Challenger de Saguenay, currently sponsored as Challenger Banque Nationale de Saguenay, is a professional tennis tournament played on indoor hard courts. The event is classified as a $60,000 ITF Women's Circuit tournament and has been held in Saguenay, Quebec since 2006.

Past finals

Singles

Doubles

External links
Official website

 
ITF Women's World Tennis Tour
Tennis tournaments in Canada
Hard court tennis tournaments
Sport in Saguenay, Quebec
Tennis in Quebec
Recurring sporting events established in 2006
2006 establishments in Quebec